The Daily Titan is the student newspaper published at California State University, Fullerton in Fullerton, California. Under California law, Daily Titan is editorially independent from the university and the College of Communications. Daily Titan publishes a print edition Monday through Thursday during the fall and spring semesters, with weekly editions for the first two weeks of each semester and during finals week.

It has operated a web site since 1978.

From its founding in 1960 to spring 1968, the Daily Titan was known as the Titan Times, then briefly The Titan in fall 1968 and spring 1969. Throughout the 1960s, it published one to three times per week with occasional summer editions.

Daily Titan was given its current name and began publishing four editions each week in fall 1969. Roughly 60 reporters, editors and advertising sales executives, chosen each semester, form the staff. The news and advertising faculty advisers do not exercise editorial control.

On March 18, 2020, Daily Titan suspended daily print editions because of the COVID-19 pandemic; it has printed weekly editions during the school year since August 24, 2020.

References

California State University, Fullerton
Student newspapers published in California
Newspapers established in 1960